The 2020 elections for the Illinois Senate took place on November 3, 2020 to elect senators from 22 of the state's 59 Senate districts to serve in the 102nd General Assembly, with seats apportioned among the states based on the 2010 United States census. Under the Illinois Constitution of 1970, senators are divided into three groups, each group having a two-year term at a different part of the decade between censuses, with the rest of the decade being taken up by two four-year terms. The Democratic Party has held a majority in the Senate since 2003. The inauguration of the 102nd General Assembly occurred on Wednesday January 13, 2021.

The elections for United States President, Illinois United States Senator, Illinois's 18 congressional districts, the Illinois Fair Tax and the Illinois House were held on this date.

The Republican Party needed to gain 11 seats to earn a majority in the Senate. The Democratic Party gained one seat towards their already-existing supermajority.

Overview

Predictions

Close races

Senate President Election
On November 14, 2019, then-Senate President John Cullerton announced he would retire from the Illinois Senate. Then-Assistant Majority Leader Don Harmon and Majority Leader Kimberly A. Lightford were the two lawmakers being backed for the Senate President election. Harmon was elected as the 39th Senate President of the Illinois Senate on January 19, 2020.

Elections by district

District 1
The 1st district, located in the Chicago area, includes parts of Forest View as well as all or parts of the Chicago neighborhoods of Archer Heights, Armour Square, Bridgeport, Brighton Park, Chicago Lawn, Garfield Ridge, Lower West Side, McKinley Park, Near South Side, Near West Side, New City, and West Elsdon. The district has been represented by Democrat Antonio Munoz since January 9, 1999. Munoz faced Froy Jimenez, a CPS history teacher and soccer coach, for the Democratic nomination. After winning the Democratic nomination, Munoz faced no other ballot-listed candidates in the general election.

Endorsements

Results

District 4
The 4th district, located in the Chicago area, includes all or parts of Bellwood, Berkeley, Berwyn, Broadview, Brookfield, Forest Park, Hillside, La Grange, La Grange Park, Maywood, Melrose Park, North Riverside, Northlake, Oak Brook, Oak Park, River Forest, Westchester, and Western Springs and parts of the Chicago neighborhood of Austin. The district has been represented by Democrat Kimberly A. Lightford since November 20, 1998. Lightford faced no other ballot-listed candidates in the general election.

Endorsements

Results

District 6
The 6th district includes parts of the Chicago neighborhoods of Albany Park, Avondale, Irving Park, Lake View, Lincoln Park, Lincoln Square, Logan Square, North Center, Near North Side, and Uptown. The district was represented by Democrat John Cullerton since his appointment in 1991 and served as Senate President from 2009 to 2020. On November 14, 2019, Cullerton announced he would retire from the Illinois Senate. State Representative Sara Feigenholtz from the 12th district was appointed to the seat on January 22, 2020. No primary election was held and Feigenholtz faced no other ballot-listed candidates in the general election.

District 7
The 7th district, located in the Chicago area, includes parts of Evanston and includes all or parts of the Chicago neighborhoods of Albany Park, Edgewater, Lake View, North Center, North Park, Rogers Park, Uptown, and West Ridge. The district has been represented by Democrat Heather Steans since her appointment on February 10, 2008. Steans faced no other ballot-listed candidates in the general election.

Endorsements

District 10
The 10th district, located in the Chicago area, includes parts of Des Plaines, Elmwood Park, Franklin Park, Harwood Heights, Niles, Norridge, Park Ridge, River Grove, Rosemont, and Schiller Park and includes parts of the Chicago neighborhoods of Dunning, Edison Park, Forest Glen, Jefferson Park, Norwood Park, O'Hare, and Portage Park. The district had been represented by Democrat John Mulroe since his appointment in August 2010. Mulroe announced he would step down as a state senator on June 21, 2019 to become a judge in the 10th Cook County Judicial Subcircuit. State Representative Robert Martwick was appointed on June 28, 2019 to fill the vacancy. Martwick faced Danny O'Toole, a sergeant with the Chicago Police Department, for the Democratic nomination. Martwick won the Democratic nomination. Anthony Beckman, a police officer from Norridge, was the Republican nominee.

Endorsements

Results

District 11
The 11th district, located in the Chicago area, includes parts of Bedford Park, Bridgeview, Burbank, Cicero, Forest View, Lyons, McCook, Riverside, Stickney, and Summit and includes all or parts of the Chicago neighborhoods of Archer Heights, Ashburn, Brighton Park, Chicago Lawn, Clearing, Gage Park, Garfield Ridge, Lower West Side, McKinley Park, South Lawndale, West Elsdon, and West Lawn. The district had been represented by Democrat Martin Sandoval since January 9, 2013. He previously served as a state senator for the 12th district from January 8, 2003 to January 9, 2013. Sandoval announced that he would resign as state senator effective January 1, 2020 amid a corruption scandal and would later on plead guilty to bribery charges. State Representative Celina Villanueva was appointed to fill the vacancy. Mary Ellen "Mari" Brown, a small business owner, ran in the general election under a new political party called Democracy in America.

Endorsements

Results

District 13
The 13th district includes all or parts of the Chicago neighborhoods of Calumet Heights, Douglas, East Side, Grand Boulevard, Hegewisch, Hyde Park, Kenwood, Loop, Near North Side, Near South Side, South Chicago, South Deering, South Shore, Washington Park, and Woodlawn. The district had been represented by Democrat Kwame Raoul since November 6, 2004. After winning in the 2018 general election to become Illinois Attorney General, Raoul vacated his state senator seat. Robert Peters, political director of Reclaim Chicago, was appointed to the seat on January 6, 2019. Peters faced Ken Thomas, an attorney, for the Democratic nomination. After winning the nomination, Peters faced no other ballot-listed candidates in the general election.

Endorsements

Results

District 16
The 16th district, located in the Chicago area, includes parts of Bedford Park, Bridgeview, Burbank, Burr Ridge, Chicago Ridge, Countryside, Hickory Hills, Hodgkins, Hometown, Indian Head Park, Justice, Oak Lawn, Palos Hills, and Willow Springs and parts of the Chicago neighborhoods of Ashburn, Chicago Lawn, Englewood, Greater Grand Crossing, West Englewood, and Woodlawn. The district has been represented by Democrat Jacqueline Y. Collins since January 8, 2003. Collins faced no other ballot-listed candidates in the general election.

Endorsements

District 19
The 19th district, located in the Chicago area, includes all or parts of Country Club Hills, Flossmoor, Frankfort, Frankfort Square, Harvey, Hazel Crest, Homer Glen, Homewood, Joliet, Lockport, Markham, Matteson, Mokena, New Lenox, Oak Forest, Olympia Fields, Orland Park, Park Forest, Richton Park, Tinley Park, and University Park. The district has been represented by Democrat Michael Hastings since January 9, 2013. Hastings faced no other ballot-listed candidates in the general election.

Endorsements

Results

District 22
The 22nd district, located in the Chicago area, includes all or parts of Barrington Hills, Bartlett, Carpentersville, East Dundee, Elgin, Hanover Park, Hoffman Estates, Schaumburg, Hoffman Estates, South Elgin, and Streamwood. The district has been represented by Democrat Cristina Castro since January 11, 2017. Castro faced Rae Yawer, the Commissioner of the Streamwood Park District Board, for the Democratic nomination. After winning the nomination, Castro faced no other ballot-listed candidates in the general election.

Endorsements

Results

District 25
The 25th district, located in the Chicago area, includes all or parts of Aurora, Bartlett, Batavia, Big Rock, Campton Hills, Elburn, Elgin, Geneva, Geneva, Lily Lake, Montgomery, Naperville, North Aurora, Oswego, Plano, Prestbury, South Elgin, St. Charles, Sugar Grove, Warrenville, Wayne, West Chicago, and Yorkville. The district has been represented by Republican Jim Oberweis since January 9, 2013. Oberweis announced in 2019 his plans to run in the 14th congressional district, leaving his own seat open. Two candidates ran for the Republican nomination: Beth Goncher, executive director of the Sugar Grove Chamber and independent consultant and Jeanette Ward, product manager for an international chemical company. Ward won the Republican nomination. Karina Villa, the first-term state representative from the 49th district, was the Democratic nominee.

Endorsements

Results

District 28
The 28th district, located in the Chicago area, includes parts of Arlington Heights, Des Plaines, Elk Grove Village, Hanover Park, Hoffman Estates, Mount Prospect, Palatine, Park Ridge, Rolling Meadows, Roselle, and Schaumburg as well as parts of the Chicago neighborhood of O'Hare. The district has been represented by Democrat Laura Murphy since her appointment on October 5, 2015. Murphy faced no other ballot-listed candidates in the general election.

Endorsements

Results

District 31
The 31st district, located in the Chicago area, includes all or parts of Antioch, Beach Park, Gages Lake, Grandwood Park, Grayslake, Gurnee, Hainesville, Lake Villa, Lindenhurst, Long Lake, Old Mill Creek, Round Lake, Round Lake Beach, Round Lake Heights, Round Lake Park, Third Lake, Venetian Village, Volo, Wadsworth, Wauconda, Waukegan, Winthrop Harbor, and Zion. The district has been represented by Democrat Melinda Bush since January 9, 2013. Christopher Kasperski, a former combat veteran and campaign manager for State Senator Craig Wilcox, was the Republican nominee.

Endorsements

District 34
The 34th district, located in the Rockford metropolitan area, includes parts of Cherry Valley, Loves Park, Machesney Park, Rockford, and Roscoe. The district has been represented by Democrat Steve Stadelman since January 9, 2013. Paul Hofmann, a former worker for an aerospace company, was the Republican nominee in the general election.

District 37
The 37th district, located partly in the Peoria metropolitan area, covers all or parts of Aledo, Alexis, Alpha, Altona, Amboy, Andover, Annawan, Atkinson, Bay View Gardens, Bishop Hill, Bradford, Brimfield, Buda, Cambridge, Chillicothe, Dana, Dover, Dunlap, East Galesburg, Elmwood, Galesburg, Galva, Geneseo, Germantown Hills, Gilson, Harmon, Henderson, Henry, Hooppole, Hopewell, Joy, Keithsburg, Kewanee, Knoxville, La Fayette, La Moille, La Rose, Lacon, Leonore, London Mills, Lostant, Manlius, Maquon, Matherville, Metamora, Mineral, Neponset, New Bedford, New Boston, North Henderson, Oak Run, Ohio, Oneida, Orion, Peoria, Peoria Heights, Princeville, Rio, Roanoke, Rome, Rutland, Seaton, Sheffield, Sherrard, Sparland, Spring Bay, Sublette, Tiskilwa, Toluca, Toulon, Varna, Victoria, Viola, Walnut, Washburn, Wataga, Wenona, Williamsfield, Windsor, Woodhull, Wyanet, Wyoming, and Yates City. The district has been represented by Republican Chuck Weaver since his appointment in October 2015. Weaver announced on January 9, 2020 he plans to retire from the Illinois Senate at the end of his term. Widmer Fabrics CEO Win Stoller as a result was the sole candidate running for the Republican nomination. Stoller faced no other ballot-listed candidates in the general election.

District 40
The 40th district, located partly in the Chicago area, includes all or parts of Aroma Park, Beecher, Bonfield, Bourbonnais, Braceville, Bradley, Buckingham, Cabery, Chebanse, Chicago Heights, Coal City, East Brooklyn, Essex, Flossmoor, Frankfort, Gardner, Glenwood, Godley, Hazel Crest, Herscher, Homewood, Hopkins Park, Irwin, Joliet, Kankakee, Limestone, Manhattan, Matteson, Mokena, Momence, Monee, New Lenox, Olympia Fields, Park Forest, Peotone, Reddick, Richton Park, Sammons Point, South Chicago Heights, South Wilmington, St. Anne, Steger, Symerton, Sun River Terrace, Union Hill, University Park, and Wilmington. The district had been represented by Democrat Toi Hutchinson since her appointment on January 5, 2009. Hutchinson vacated her seat in 2019 after being appointed the Illinois Cannabis Regulation Oversight Officer or 'Marijuana Czar.' Patrick Joyce, a local farmer, was appointed to the seat on November 8, 2019. Joyce faced three other candidates for the Democratic nomination: Monica Gordon, executive director of the Illinois Legislative Black Caucus; Marta Perales, Kankakee County Democratic Party communications secretary; and Chicago Heights City Clerk Lori Wilcox. Joyce won the Democratic nomination. Dr. Eric Wallace, an ordained minister and co-founder of Freedom's Journal Institute, was the Republican nominee.

District 43
The 43rd district, located in the Chicago area, covers all or parts of Bolingbrook, Channahon, Crest Hill, Elmwood, Fairmont, Ingalls Park, Joliet, Lemont, Lockport, Naperville, New Lenox, Preston Heights, Rockdale, Romeoville, Shorewood, and Woodridge. The district has been represented by Democrat Pat McGuire since his appointment on February 25, 2012. On September 23, 2019, McGuire announced he would not seek re-election. State Representative John Connor from the 85th district was the Democratic nominee. Ben Bierly, a Marine veteran, was the Republican nominee.

Endorsements

Results

District 46
The 46th district, located in the Peoria metropolitan area, includes all or parts of Banner, Bartonville, Bellevue, Bryant, Canton, Creve Coeur, Cuba, Dunfermline, East Peoria, Fairview, Farmington, Glasford, Hanna City, Kingston Mines, Lake Camelot, Lewistown, Liverpool, Mapleton, Marquette Heights, Morton, Norris, North Pekin, Norwood, Pekin, Peoria, Peoria Heights, South Pekin, St. David, and West Peoria. The district has been represented by Democrat Dave Koehler since December 2006. Tazewell County Treasurer Mary Burress was the Republican nominee.

Endorsements

Results

District 49
The 49th district, located in the Chicago area, includes all or parts of  Aurora, Bolingbrook, Boulder Hill, Channahon, Crest Hill, Crystal Lawns, Joliet, Montgomery, Naperville, Oswego, Plainfield, Romeoville, and Shorewood. The district has been represented by Democrat Jennifer Bertino-Tarrant since January 9, 2013. Bertino-Tarrant announced in 2019 her intention to run for Will County executive, leaving her own state senator seat open. Three candidates ran for the Democratic nomination: Meg Loughran Cappel, a special education teacher; Michael Crowner, an independent consultant; and Larry E. Hug, a licensed independent insurance agent. Cappel won the Democratic nomination. Tom McCullagh, a small business owner, was the Republican nominee.

Endorsements

Results

District 52
The 52nd district, located in the Champaign-Urbana metropolitan area, including all or parts of Belgium, Catlin, Champaign, Danville, Fithian, Georgetown, Gifford, Indianola, Muncie, Oakwood, Olivet, Penfield, Rantoul, Ridge Farm, Royal, Savoy, Thomasboro, Tilton, Urbana, and Westville. The district has been represented by Democrat Scott M. Bennett since his appointment on January 12, 2015. AJ Ruggieri was the Republican nominee in the general election.

District 55
The 55th district, located partially in the Illinois Wabash Valley, includes all or parts of Albion, Allendale, Annapolis, Ashmore, Bellmont, Bone Gap, Bridgeport, Browns, Burnt Prairie, Calhoun, Carmi, Casey, Charleston, Cisne, Claremont, Clay City, Crossville, Dieterich, Enfield, Fairfield, Flat Rock, Flora, Golden Gate, Grayville, Greenup, Humboldt, Hutsonville, Iola, Jeffersonville, Jewett, Johnsonville, Kansas, Keenes, Keensburg, Lawrenceville, Lerna, Louisville, Marshall, Martinsville, Mattoon, Maunie, Montrose, Mount Carmel, Mount Erie, Neoga, Newtown, Noble, Norris City, Oakland, Oblong, Olney, Palestine, Parkersburg, Phillipstown, Robinson, Rose Hill, Russellville, Sailor Springs, Sims, Springerton, St. Francisville, Ste. Marie, Stoy, Sumner, Teutopolis, Toledo, Watson, Wayne City, West Salem, West Union, West York, Westfield, Wheeler, Willow Hill, Xenia, and Yale. The district has been represented by Republican Dale Righter since January 8, 2003. On May 17, 2019, Righter announced he would not seek re-election. Two candidates ran for the Republican nomination: first-term State Representative Darren Bailey from the 109th district and Jeff Fleming, an attorney and co-chair of the Southeastern Illinois Friends of NRA. Bailey won the Republican nomination. Cynthia Given, the Democratic candidate in the 2018 Illinois House of Representatives election in the 109th district, was the Democratic nominee in the general election.

District 58
The 58th district, located in parts of the Metro East and Metro Lakeland, includes all or parts of Alto Pass, Anna, Ashley, Ava, Baldwin, Belle Rive, Bluford, Bonnie, Cahokia, Campbell Hill, Carbondale, Centralia, Chester, Cobden, Columbia, Coulterville, Cutler, Darmstadt, De Soto, Dix, Dongola, Du Bois, Du Quoin, Dupo, East Carondelet, Elkville, Ellis Grove, Evansville, Fayetteville, Floraville, Fults, Gorham, Grand Tower, Harrison, Hecker, Ina, Jonesboro, Kaskaskia, Lenzburg, Maeystown, Makanda, Marissa, Mill Creek, Millstadt, Mount Vernon, Murphysboro, Nashville, New Athens, Opdyke, Paderborn, Percy, Pinckneyville, Prairie du Rocher, Radom, Red Bud, Richview, Rockwood, Ruma, Sauget, Smithton, Sparta, St. Johns, St. Libory, Steeleville, Tamaroa, Tilden, Valmeyer, Vergennes, Waltonville, Waterloo, Willisville, and Woodlawn. The district has been represented by Republican Paul Schimpf since January 11, 2017. Schimpf announced in 2019 that he would not seek re-election. State Representative Terri Bryant from the 115th district was the Republican nominee. After winning the Republican nomination, Bryant faced no other ballot-listed candidates in the general election.

References

External links
 Find your district/elected officials 
 Illinois Online Voter Registration Application 
 Polling Place Lookup

External links
 
 
  (State affiliate of the U.S. League of Women Voters)
 

2020 Illinois elections
Illinois Senate
Illinois Senate elections